Abu Musa al-Jazuli (full name: Īsā ibn ‘Abd al-Azīz ibn Yalalbakht ibn Īsā ibn Yūmārīlī al-Barbarī al-Marākeshī al-Yazadaktnī al-‘Alāmah), was a Moroccan philologist and grammarian, who produced an encyclopaedia called Al-Qānūn, or Al-Muqaddima of al-Jazūlī. Many scholars wrote tafsir (literary critiques) or sharḥ (commentaries), and it was incorporated in many grammars. Nevertheless, its opacity challenged the best language scholars. Al-Jazūlī was the first to introduce Al-Ṣiḥāḥ fī al-lughah of al-Jawhari to the Maghreb, and he makes many references to this and other works in his Muqaddima.

Life
Al-Jazuli was probably born in 540 AH (1146 AD) at Idaw gharda. He was from the Yazdaktan tribe, a branch of the Berber tribe Jazula in the Sous region of Morocco. His early education was in the cosmopolitan Moroccan city of Marrakesh, the Almohad capital filled with scholars, writers and grammarians, fine buildings, fountains and public amenities.

After his early education in Marrakesh, Al-Jazuli went to make the pilgrimage to Mecca and medina. Returning from the hajj, he stayed in Cairo and Alexandria. Although he experienced poverty there he attended lectures under Abū Muḥammad ‘Abd Allāh ibn Barrī on Assihah of al-Jawhari and al-Jumal of al-Zajjaji. He also studied the Ṣaḥīḥ of al-Bukhari with Abū Muḥammad ibn ‘Ubayd Allāh. Financial hardship forced his return to the Maghreb. At Béjaïa, he lectured on philology for a time, then moved on to Algiers and taught his Qānūn to the grammarian Abū ibn Qāsim ibn Mandās al-Āshīrī. He then travelled to Almería, in Al-Andalus (present-day Spain), to teach for a period. Then he returned to Morocco and settled down in Marrakesh, where he started teaching Arabic. As his Qānūn became famous and his reputation grew, so students from far and wide came to hear him lecture. When the mosque where he taught became full to capacity he moved to the Mosque of Ibn al-Abakm, north of Mahallat al-Sharqiyyin, under the passage of the Great Bab Aghmat to the side of Al Awadin. The ascetic Abū 'l-‘Abbās al-Maghribī, made representations to the Almohad Caliph, al-Mansur, who entrusted al-Jazūlī with the khuṭba at the great mosque at Marrakesh. Before his death, al-Mansur declared in his will that the only one who will wash his body is al-Jazuli. Ibn Khallikan quotes a satirical verse that al-Jazuli is said to have quipped to a pestering student about the eighth-century grammarian of the Basra school, Abu 'Amr ibn al-'Ala', wherein he puns a famous grammatical example of declension.                         

Al-Jazūlī died at Azemmour, Morocco  AH ( AD).

His Professors
Ibn Barrī; who lectured on Al-Jumal by al-Zajjājī, Al-Kitāb by Sībawayh and Al-Uṣūl by Ibn al-Sarraj. Material from these studies were incorporated into Al-Qānūn. Such was his dire financial state while in Alméria, he had to sell his own autograph copy of Al-Uṣūl.
Abū Muhammad ibn ‘Ubayd Allāh al-Hajri al-Adawi al-Andalusi, who lectured on the Ṣaḥīḥ of al-Bukhārī.
Muhallab ibn al-Ḥassān ibn Barakat ibn Ali ibn Ghayath ibn Salman al-Muhallabī al-Naḥwī, a student of Ibn Barri, al-Jazuli studied nahw under him.
Abū Ṭāhir al-Silafī
Abū Hafs Umar ibn Abī Bakr b. Ibrāhīm al-Tamimi al-Saadi al-Saqaili
Abu al-Mansur Zafir al-Maliki al-Usuli, studied uṣūl al-fiqh under him
Abu Abdallah ibn Ibrahim al-Jaza'iri, studied uṣūl al-fiqh under him

His Disciples
Ibn Mu‘ṭī al-Zawāwī grammarian, author of Alfiyya.
Abū ‘Alī ‘Umar ibn Muḥammad ibn ‘Umar ibn ‘Abd Allāh al-Azdī al-Shalūbīnī edited al-Jazūlī 's Qānūn with commentaries.
Alam al-Din al-Qasim ibn Ahmad ibn al-Muwaffaq al-Luraqi al-Andalusi.

Works
Sharh qasidat Banat Su'ad (Commentary on Bānat Su‘ād by Ka'b ibn Zuhayr), ed., R. Basset (Algiers, 1910)
Al-Qānūn, (Al-Muqaddima al-Jazūliyya), ‘The Canon’, or ‘The Introduction of al-Jazūli’; a dense, esoteric and scholarly classification of rare linguistic expressions; (commentary); Ibn Khallikān called it ‘a most original production.’
Amālī fi 'l-naḥw (dictations on grammar);
Al-Fasr, ‘The Explanation’; An abridged version of the Abū al-Fath ‘Uthman b. Jinnī’s commentary on al-Mutanabbī’s dīwān
Commentary on the 'Uṣūl' of Ibn al-Sarrāj; (grammar).

Notes

References

Bibliography

 

 
 

1146 births
1211 deaths
12th-century Berber people
12th-century Moroccan historians
12th-century philologists
13th-century Berber people
13th-century Moroccan historians
13th-century philologists
Moroccan bibliographers
Moroccan biographers
Moroccan editors
Moroccan philologists
Moroccan scholars
People from Marrakesh